Gerard Jones is an American retired ice hockey goaltender who was an All-American for Yale.

Career
Jones was a 3-year starter for Murray Murdoch and played well in net for an otherwise mediocre team. As a junior Jones set a program record by stopping 66 shots in a 1–7 loss to St. Lawrence on December 14 (a record that stands as of 2020). The following year Jones was able to get Yale to post a winning record in both overall and became the first AHCA All-American in program history.

Awards and honors

References

External links

1937 births
Living people
American ice hockey goaltenders
Yale Bulldogs men's ice hockey players
Ice hockey players from Connecticut
Sportspeople from Greenwich, Connecticut
AHCA Division I men's ice hockey All-Americans